

Acts of the Northern Ireland Assembly

|-
|{{|Horse Racing (Amendment) Act (Northern Ireland) 2022|ania|2|02-02-2022|maintained=y|archived=n|An Act to amend the Horse Racing (Northern Ireland) Order 1990 to allow for payments to be made from the Horse Racing Fund to horse racecourse operators; and for connected purposes.}}
|-
|{{|Health and Social Care Act (Northern Ireland) 2022|ania|3|02-02-2022|maintained=y|archived=n|An Act to dissolve the Regional Health and Social Care Board; to make provision for and in connection with the exercise by the Department of Health and Health and Social Care trusts of the functions of the Board; and for connected purposes.}}
|-
|{{|Criminal Justice (Committal Reform) Act (Northern Ireland) 2022|ania|4|07-03-2022|maintained=y|archived=n|An Act to amend the law relating to committal for trial.}}
|-
|{{|Parental Bereavement (Leave and Pay) Act (Northern Ireland) 2022|ania|5|21-03-2022|maintained=y|archived=n|An Act to make provision about leave and pay for employees whose children have died or who have experienced a miscarriage.}}
|-
| {{|Budget Act (Northern Ireland) 2022|ania|6|24-03-2022|maintained=y|archived=n|An Act to authorise the issue out of the Consolidated Fund of certain sums for the service of the years ending 31 March 2022 and 2023; to appropriate those sums for specified purposes; to authorise the use for the public service of certain resources for those years; to revise the limits on the use of certain accruing resources in the year ending 31 March 2022; and to authorise the Department of Finance to borrow on the credit of the sum appropriated for the year ending 31 March 2023.}}
|-
|{{|Social Security (Terminal Illness) Act (Northern Ireland) 2022|ania|7|30-03-2022|maintained=y|archived=n|An Act to provide that special social security rules which apply where life expectancy is 6 months or less are instead to apply where life expectancy is 12 months or less.}}
|-
|{{|inancial Reporting (Departments and Public Bodies) Act (Northern Ireland) 2022|ania|8|30-03-2022|maintained=y|archived=n|An Act to amend the law relating to the preparation of estimates and accounts of departments and certain non-departmental public bodies; and for connected purposes.}}
|-
| {{|Animal Welfare (Service Animals) Act (Northern Ireland) 2022|ania|9|30-03-2022|maintained=y|archived=n|An Act to amend the Welfare of Animals Act (Northern Ireland) 2011 in relation to service animals.}}
|-
| {{|Organ and Tissue Donation (Deemed Consent) Act (Northern Ireland) 2022|ania|10|30-03-2022|maintained=y|archived=n|An Act to amend the Human Tissue Act 2004 concerning consent to activities done for the purpose of transplantation and make consequential amendments about the provision of information about such consent.}}
|-
|{{|Charities Act (Northern Ireland) 2022|ania|11|30-03-2022|maintained=y|archived=n|An Act to make provision about the lawfulness of decisions taken or other things done by staff of the Charity Commission for Northern Ireland, and about exempting charities, by reference to conditions related to thresholds, from the duty to be registered in the register of charities.}}
|-
|{{|Non-domestic Rates Valuations (Coronavirus) Act (Northern Ireland) 2022|ania|12|30-03-2022|maintained=y|archived=n|An Act to vary the application of Article 39A of the Rates (Northern Ireland) Order 1977 in consequence of matters attributable to coronavirus; and to confer power to make equivalent provision for other infections or contaminations.}}
|-
| {{|Autism (Amendment) Act (Northern Ireland) 2022|ania|13|26-04-2022|maintained=y|archived=n|An Act to amend the Autism Act (Northern Ireland) 2011.}}
|-
| {{|Betting, Gaming, Lotteries and Amusements (Amendment) Act (Northern Ireland) 2022|ania|14|26-04-2022|maintained=y|archived=n|An Act to amend the Betting, Gaming, Lotteries and Amusements (Northern Ireland) Order 1985; and for connected purposes.}}
|-
| {{|Integrated Education Act (Northern Ireland) 2022|ania|15|26-04-2022|maintained=y|archived=n|An Act to make provision about integrated education; and for connected purposes.}}
|-
| {{|Motor Vehicles (Compulsory Insurance) Act (Northern Ireland) 2022|ania|16|26-04-2022|maintained=y|archived=n|An Act to amend retained EU law relating to compulsory insurance for the use of motor vehicles; and for connected purposes.}}
|-
| {{|Protection from Stalking Act (Northern Ireland) 2022|ania|17|26-04-2022|maintained=y|archived=n|An Act to provide protection from stalking, and from threatening or abusive behaviour, and for related purposes..}}
|-
|{{|Adoption and Children Act (Northern Ireland) 2022|ania|18|27-04-2022|maintained=y|archived=n|An Act to restate and amend the law relating to adoption; to make further amendments of the law relating to children; and for connected purposes.}}
|-
|{{|Justice (Sexual Offences and Trafficking Victims) Act (Northern Ireland) 2022|ania|19|27-04-2022|maintained=y|archived=n|An Act to make provision about and in connection with sexual offences; regulate particular matters relating to cases of trafficking or exploitation; and amend certain rules of law and procedure for the purpose of protecting people from harm.}}
|-
|{{|Private Tenancies Act (Northern Ireland) 2022|ania|20|27-04-2022|maintained=y|archived=n|An Act to amend the law relating to private tenancies.}}
|-
|{{|School Age Act (Northern Ireland) 2022|ania|21|27-04-2022|maintained=y|archived=n|An Act to amend the law relating to private tenancies.}}
|-
|{{|Welfare Supplementary Payments (Amendment) Act (Northern Ireland) 2022|ania|22|27-04-2022|maintained=y|archived=n|An Act to remove the end date for qualifying for payments under Article 137A of the Welfare Reform (Northern Ireland) Order 2015; and provide for monitoring of and reporting on arrangements for payments having effect by virtue of Article 137 and Article 137A of that Order.}}
|-
| {{|Fair Employment (School Teachers) Act (Northern Ireland) 2022|ania|23|12-05-2022|maintained=y|archived=n|An Act to remove the exception for school teachers from the Fair Employment and Treatment (Northern Ireland) Order 1998; and for connected purposes.}}
|-
|{{|Hospital Parking Charges Act (Northern Ireland) 2022|ania|24|12-05-2022|maintained=y|archived=n|An Act to prohibit the imposition of charges for parking vehicles in hospital car parks.}}
|-
|{{|Period Products (Free Provision) Act (Northern Ireland) 2022|ania|25|12-05-2022|maintained=y|archived=n|An Act to secure the provision throughout Northern Ireland of free period products; and for connected purposes.}}
|-
| {{|Preservation of Documents (Historical Institutions) Act (Northern Ireland) 2022|ania|26|12-05-2022|maintained=y|archived=n|An Act to make provision for the preservation of documents relating to certain institutions and residents of those institutions between 1922 and 1995, and to certain children of those residents.}}
|-
|{{|Domestic Abuse (Safe Leave) Act (Northern Ireland) 2022|ania|27|12-05-2022|maintained=y|archived=n|An Act to make provision for an entitlement to paid safe leave for victims of domestic abuse; and for connected purposes.}}
|-
| {{|Support for Mortgage Interest etc (Security for Loans) Act (Northern Ireland) 2022|ania|28|06-06-2022|maintained=y|archived=n|An Act to provide for loans under Article 13 of the Welfare Reform and Work (Northern Ireland) Order 2016 to be charged on land and for the charges to be registrable in the Statutory Charges Register.}}
|-
|{{|General Teaching Council (Directions) Act (Northern Ireland) 2022|ania|29|06-06-2022|maintained=y|archived=n|An Act to empower the Department of Education to give binding directions to the General Teaching Council for Northern Ireland.}}
|-
|{{|Defamation Act (Northern Ireland) 2022|ania|30|06-06-2022|maintained=y|archived=n|An Act to amend the law of defamation.}}
|-
|{{|Climate Change Act (Northern Ireland) 2022|ania|31|06-06-2022|maintained=y|archived=n| An Act to set targets for the years 2050, 2040 and 2030 for the reduction of greenhouse gas emissions; to provide for a system of carbon budgeting; to provide for reporting and statements against those targets and budgets; to confer power to impose climate change reporting duties on public bodies; to provide for reports and advice from the Committee on Climate Change; and for connected purposes.}}
}}

References

2022